Gajak (also gachak) is a dessert or confection originating in north-central India. It is a dry sweet made of sesame seeds (til) or peanuts and jaggery. The til is cooked in the raw sugar syrup and set in thin layers, which can be stored for months.

Preparation
Gajak (Hindi: "गजक") is prepared with sesame seeds and jaggery with a method of preparation which is time-consuming. It takes about 10–15 hours to prepare 5–8 kilograms of gajaks. The dough is hammered until all the sesame seeds break down and release their oils into the dough.

One kilogram of gazak requires about one-fourth of jaggery to sesame. Varieties can include dry fruits.

Varieties 
Ingredients and shape can vary. By ingredient,
 Gud-til gajak
 Til-revadi gajak
 Khasta gajak
 Til-Mawa gajak

See also
 Chikki
 List of sesame seed dishes

References

North Indian cuisine
Indian desserts
Confectionery
Sesame dishes